Count Ferdinand Joseph Maria of Salern (1718 – 7 December 1805) was an illegitimate son of Prince Ferdinand Maria Innocenz of Bavaria (1699-1738) and Countess Marie Adelheid Fortunata of Spaur.  He was thus a nephew of Emperor Charles VII and his brothers Clemens Augustus, elector and archbishop of Cologne, and Cardinal Johann Theodore, bishop of Freising, Regensburg and Liège.

Salern owned the Lordship of Geltolfing near Straubing.  During the Napoleonic Wars, he served as a general of the artillery.  From 1804, he had his own infantry regiment "Count Salern", which had been formed from the Royal Bavarian Infantry Regiment No. 4 "King William of Württemberg".

As the General Intendant for music at the Bavarian court, he was a patron of Wolfgang Amadeus Mozart.  In 1779, he was elected as a full member of the Bavarian Academy of Sciences and Humanities.  In the painting at the top of this article, he is represented as a trusted friend of his cousin Maximilian III Joseph, in the "woodturning" cabinet at Nymphenburg Palace.

Marriages and issue 
Salern was married twice.  His first marriage was to Countess Marie Mechthildis of Törring-Seefeld (1734–1764).  He had a son with her, Maximilian of Salern. With his death, the Salern line died out.

His second wife was Countess Josepha of La Rosee (died 1772). With her, he had two daughters, Maria Josepha and Adelaide.

References
 Hans & Marga Rall: Die Wittelsbacher in Lebensbildern, Munich, 1986; 
 Hans & Erich Valentin, Eckehardt Nölle and Horst Stierhof: Die Wittelsbacher und ihre Künstler in acht Jahrhunderten, Munich, 1980; 
 Carl Eduard Vehse: Die Höfe zu Bayern, Leipzig, 1994; 
 Felix Joseph Lipowsky: Leben und Thaten des Maximilian Joseph, III, Munich, 1833

1718 births
1805 deaths
Military personnel of Bavaria
Members of the Bavarian Academy of Sciences
Counts of Germany
House of Wittelsbach
18th-century German people
Date of birth unknown